Wimpole's Folly is a folly ruin located in the grounds of Wimpole Hall, in the parish of Wimpole, in Cambridgeshire, England.

The folly is designed to resemble the ruins of a medieval castle, but is not a ruin itself. It was built on the grounds of Wimpole Hall in the mid-1770s at the order of Philip Yorke, 2nd Earl of Hardwicke, the then owner of Wimpole Hall. The Earl of Hardwicke commissioned Sanderson Miller (the noted follies architect of the day) to design the folly in 1751, to then have it later built by Capability Brown in 1769. The folly is Grade II* listed on the National Heritage List for England.

The ruins are substantially built and stretch for two hundred feet in length, and include a four-storey Gothic tower. They, and Wimpole Hall, are owned by the National Trust and are open to the public.

Wimpole's Folly was featured in Slow Horses, Season One, Episode Six, titled "Follies."

References

External links
National Trust Wimpole Hall webpage

Tourist attractions in Cambridgeshire
National Trust properties in Cambridgeshire
Folly buildings in England
Folly castles in England
Grade II* listed buildings in Cambridgeshire
Ruins in Cambridgeshire
Folly